Juan David Victoria López (born 24 January 1996), commonly known as Juancho, is a Colombian footballer who plays as a forward for Salamanca.

Club career
Born in Palmira, Valle del Cauca, Juancho joined Rayo Vallecano's youth setup in 2012, from CD Leganés. He made his senior debut with the reserves on 22 March 2015, coming on as a second-half substitute in a 2–1 Segunda División B home win against Real Madrid Castilla.

Juancho scored his first senior goal on 20 September 2015, netting the opener in a 2–1 home win against RSD Alcalá in the Tercera División. He was regularly used during the following two seasons, scoring eight goals in 2016–17.

In July 2017, Juancho moved to another reserve team, Club Recreativo Granada of the third division. He made his professional debut with the main squad on 26 August 2018, replacing Alberto in a 1–1 Segunda División home draw against CD Lugo. On 2 September 2019, Juancho terminated his contract with the Andalusians.

On 17 January 2020, Juancho moved to Las Rozas CF on a free transfer.

References

External links

1996 births
Living people
People from Palmira, Valle del Cauca
Colombian footballers
Association football forwards
Segunda División players
Segunda División B players
Tercera División players
Rayo Vallecano B players
Club Recreativo Granada players
Granada CF footballers
Las Rozas CF players
SCR Peña Deportiva players
Salamanca CF UDS players
Colombian expatriate footballers
Colombian expatriate sportspeople in Spain
Expatriate footballers in Spain
Sportspeople from Valle del Cauca Department
21st-century Colombian people